Menemerus is a genus of jumping spiders that was first described by Eugène Louis Simon in 1868. Most species have white edges on the thorax. The abdomen is often oval, or sometimes elongated or rounded.

Species
 it contains sixty-seven species, found worldwide in warmer climates.
M. affinis Wesolowska & van Harten, 2010 – United Arab Emirates
M. albocinctus Keyserling, 1890 – India (Nicobar Is.)
M. animatus O. Pickard-Cambridge, 1876 – Senegal to Iraq
M. arabicus Prószyński, 1993 – Saudi Arabia
M. bicolor Peckham & Peckham, 1896 – Guatemala
M. bifurcus Wesolowska, 1999 – Southern Africa
M. bivittatus (Dufour, 1831) – Africa. Introduced to North, Central and South America, southern Europe, China, Japan, Australia, Pacific Is.,
M. brachygnathus (Thorell, 1887) – India to Japan
M. brevibulbis (Thorell, 1887) – Senegal to India
M. carlini (Peckham & Peckham, 1903) – Southern Africa
M. congoensis Lessert, 1927 – Sudan to South Africa
M. cummingorum Wesolowska, 2007 – Zimbabwe
M. davidi Prószyński & Wesolowska, 1999 – North Africa, Israel, Jordan
M. depressus Franganillo, 1930 – Cuba
M. desertus Wesolowska, 1999 – Algeria
M. dimidius (Schmidt, 1976) – Canary Is.
M. eburnensis Berland & Millot, 1941 – West Africa
M. errabundus Logunov, 2010 – Israel, Iran
M. fagei Berland & Millot, 1941 – West Africa to Yemen, Malta
M. falsificus Simon, 1868 – Southern Europe
M. fasciculatus Franganillo, 1930 – Cuba
M. felix Hogg, 1922 – Vietnam
M. formosus Wesolowska, 1999 – Kenya
M. fulvus (L. Koch, 1878) – India to Japan
M. guttatus Wesolowska, 1999 – Morocco
M. illigeri (Audouin, 1826) – Portugal, North Africa, Middle East, St. Helena
M. kochi Bryant, 1942 – Virgin Is.
M. legalli Berland & Millot, 1941 – Mali
M. legendrei Schenkel, 1963 – China
M. lesnei Lessert, 1936 – Namibia, Botswana, Mozambique, Zimbabwe
M. lesserti Lawrence, 1927 – Southern Africa
M. magnificus Wesolowska, 1999 – Cameroon
M. marginalis (Banks, 1909) – Costa Rica
M. marginatus (Kroneberg, 1875) – United Arab Emirates, Iran, Pakistan, Central Asia
M. meridionalis Wesolowska, 1999 – South Africa
M. minshullae Wesolowska, 1999 – Zimbabwe, Malawi, South Africa
M. mirabilis Wesolowska, 1999 – Ethiopia
M. modestus Wesolowska, 1999 – Tunisia
M. namibicus Wesolowska, 1999 – Namibia
M. natalis Wesolowska, 1999 – South Africa
M. nigeriensis Wesolowska & Russell-Smith, 2011 – Nigeria
M. nigli Wesołowska & Freudenschuss, 2012 – Pakistan, India
M. ochraceus Franganillo, 1930 – Cuba
M. pallescens Wesolowska & van Harten, 2007 – Yemen
M. paradoxus Wesolowska & van Harten, 1994 – Yemen
M. patellaris Wesolowska & van Harten, 2007 – Yemen
M. pentamaculatus Hu, 2001 – China
M. pilosus Wesolowska, 1999 – Namibia, South Africa
M. placidus Wesolowska, 1999 – Namibia
M. plenus Wesolowska & van Harten, 1994 – Yemen
M. proximus Franganillo, 1935 – Cuba
M. pulcher Wesolowska, 1999 – Mauritania
M. rabaudi Berland & Millot, 1941 – Guinea
M. regius Wesolowska, 1999 – Ethiopia
M. rubicundus Lawrence, 1928 – Namibia, South Africa
M. sabulosus Wesolowska, 1999 – Namibia
M. schutzae Denis, 1961 – France
M. semilimbatus (Hahn, 1829) (type) – Canary Is., Mediterranean, Eastern Europe, Turkey, Caucasus, Iran. Introduced to Argentina, Chile, USA
M. silver Wesolowska, 1999 – Tunisia
M. soldani (Audouin, 1826) – North Africa
M. taeniatus (L. Koch, 1867) – Mediterranean to Kazakhstan. Introduced to Argentina
M. transvaalicus Wesolowska, 1999 – South Africa, Lesotho
M. tropicus Wesolowska, 2007 – Kenya, Uganda
M. utilis Wesolowska, 1999 – Tunisia
M. vernei Berland & Millot, 1941 – Guinea
M. wuchangensis Schenkel, 1963 – China
M. zimbabwensis Wesolowska, 1999 – Zimbabwe, South Africa

References

Salticidae
Salticidae genera
Pantropical spiders
Taxa named by Eugène Simon